Pabbajjā (Pali; Skt.: pravrajya) literally means "to go forth" and refers to when a layperson leaves home to live the life of a Buddhist renunciate among a community of bhikkhus (fully ordained monks). This generally involves preliminary ordination as a novice (m. samanera, f. samaneri). It is sometimes referred to as "lower ordination". After a period or when the novice reaches 20 years of age, the novice can be considered for the upasampadā ordination (or "higher ordination") whereby the novice becomes a monk (bhikkhu) or nun (bhikkhuni).

In some traditional Theravada countries, such as Myanmar, boys undergo pabbajjā (Shinbyu) at the age of puberty.  In Mahayana countries such as China and Japan, the pabbajjā is preceded by a probationary period.

Notes

Sources
 Encyclopædia Britannica (2007a). "Pabbajjā." Retrieved 26 September 2007 from "Encyclopædia Britannica Online" at http://www.britannica.com/eb/article-9057892.
 Encyclopædia Britannica (2007b). "Upasampadā." Retrieved 26 September 2007 from "Encyclopædia Britannica Online" at http://www.britannica.com/eb/article-9074384.

External links 
"pabbajjā" entry in the Pali Text Society's Pali-English Dictionary (1921–25).
"The Admission to the Order of Bhikkhus" in Rhys Davids & Oldenberg's English-language translation of the Vinaya Text (1881). (Note that, in this translation, the English word is spelled, "pabbaggâ.")

Buddhist monasticism